Cell adhesion molecule 3 is a protein that in humans is encoded by the CADM3 gene.

IGSF4B is a brain-specific protein related to the calcium-independent cell-cell adhesion molecules known as nectins (see PVRL3; MIM 607147) (Kakunaga et al., 2005).

References

External links

Further reading